Leonidas Sebastián Novoa Pavón (born 6 November 1992) is an Ecuadorian road cyclist, who currently rides for UCI Continental team .

Major results
2012
 1st Stage 3 (TTT) Vuelta al Ecuador
2014
 4th Road race, National Road Championships
2019
 1st Stage 1 Vuelta al Ecuador
2021
 1st Stage 3 Vuelta al Ecuador
 3rd  Road race, Pan American Road Championships
 3rd Time trial, National Road Championships
2022
 2nd  Road race, Pan American Road Championships

References

External links

1992 births
Living people
Ecuadorian male cyclists
21st-century Ecuadorian people